Tullamore RFC is an Irish rugby team based in Tullamore, County Offaly, playing in Division 2C of the All-Ireland League

Early attempts to start a club 
Tullamore is said to have had a club as far back as 1879. But it was not sufficiently organised to affiliate to the Leinster branch of the I.R.F.U. However, it is well known that rugby was played in the area, because it was popular at two local boarding schools, one in Portarlington and one in Rahan. The fact that a Birr club affiliated to the Leinster branch in 1887 does not seem to have galvanised Tullamore into action and it was only in 1927 that a Tullamore club was formed and ten years later before a Tullamore Club would affiliate to the I.R.F.U.

On Sunday 16 January 1927 a scrap team was sent to Edenderry only to be beaten. Tullamore R.F.C. was formed at a meeting on Saturday 5 February 1927. Mr. Danny Williams was elected president. The club appears to have held "Practices" each Wednesday, Saturday and Sunday at grounds on Arden Road. The first annual Dinner Dance was held at the end of the 1927-1928 season. Although the club was attracting a good following, this was its last season. For whatever reason, lack of talent or failure to practice ( not much changes) the club could not muster enthusiasm. With a club in Kilbeggan proving more successful the Tullamore players joined up with their friends in Kilbeggan. Tullamore were without a club until 1937 when new blood saw to it that the lacuna was filled.

Founding a Club

The present club was founded after a match at Derrinturn between Carberry and Tullamore. It was decided to hold a general meeting, which was held in Colton's hotel on Monday 19 April 1937. The honour of being the first president of the new club was bestowed on Dr. J. M. Prior Kennedy. Tullamore opened their first season in October with a game away to Birr at half-time Tullamore were leading 6-0 but in the end had to give way and were beaten 8-6. Of the 20 games played that season Tullamore won 6, Lost 11 and drew 3.

Town's Cup Success

From the 1937-38 season to 1946 Tullamore were five times in the Semi-final of the Provincial Towns Cup and victory coming eventually in 1946. Skerries provided the opposition in the final and wing forwards Dermot Kilroy and Oliver McGlinchey " kept the Skerries opposition under control." You can see how times have changed as Tullamore stopped off in Kilcock for a bottle of stout on their way to the game.

Town's Cup for a Second Time

Fourteen years passed before Tullamore repeated its 1946 performance and won the cup again. On 10 April 1960 Tullamore defeated Wexford 17-8 in Kilkenny in the final. At the victory Dinner, held in Spollanstown a perpetual trophy was presented by Dermot Kilroy and Oliver McGlinchey that was to be known as the Midland Shield for use in the Midland League Competition.

New Home for TRFC

The 1960s was memorable for what happened off the pitch and not on it. After several years of negotiations, offers acceptances and fresh proposals the Tullamore rugby club took over Spollanstown. A final settlement was reached with the Tullamore soccer club in 1970.

Youths

During the early 70s the club started to take positive steps to promote Juvenile rugby. In October 1974, Oliver McGlinchey with the help of big John Cahill and Denis Magner, two teachers in the town decided that Tullamore RFC needed to produce its own replacement stock for the adult teams. They set about training and coaching the youths of the area, and to date this has been a huge success and the fruits of their labour, as well as other dedicated members, can be admired in the trophy cabinet.

The club now fields U8, U10, U12, U14, U16 and U18 teams and the club are indeed proud to have fielded a number of international players namely, Ronan Kelly, Peter Bracken, Ivan Dunne, Colin Finnerty and Ray Farrell. These players also represented Leinster, as did Paul Marsden, Alan Kerin and Kevin Wynne.

The club can boast of winning trophies at all levels. In the past few seasons the club have commenced coaching in the local schools (both at Primary and Second Level) and this is proving a great success. Today, Tullamore underage as well as senior teams are respected and indeed envied in Leinster rugby. Club members have given their time unselfishly to coaching and thus given Tullamore the status it now enjoys at underage level.

Town's Cup for the third time

The Provincial Towns Cup was won again in 1976 and they qualified for the play-off in the Senior Cup. The main man in the cup final win over Drogheda was Matt Geraghty the team manager of the 1st team for the 1998-99 season. Tullamore won 9-3. In September 78 the club visited the U.S. Taking in Boston, New York, Buffalo and other centres.

The years up to 1986 do not differ remarkably to the previous years. There were cup victories each year, but none for the 1st XV since the cup of 1976. The success of juvenile teams leads one to the inescapable conclusion that the Provincial Towns Cup must surely return to Tullamore in the near future.

The current Leinster League has the focus of many players with the club consistently playing in Division 1 against some of the best players in the country.

There is always room for quality players from home and abroad and the club is always aiming to have their teams playing at the highest possible level.

Honours
 all Ireland Junior Cup : 2009, 2011
 Leinster League Division Two: 1995/1996
 Provincial Towns Cup: 1946, 1960, 1976, 2006
 Provincial Towns Seconds Cup: 1968, 1992, 2000, 2002
 Anderson Cup (Third XV): 1981, 1986, 1992, 1998
 Dunne Cup (Fourth XV): 1979, 1983, 2000
 Coonan Cup (Fifth XV): 1985, 1992, 1994
 Provincial Third XV League: 1995/1996, 1996/1997
 Provincial Towns Plate: 1990, 1992

National team players
The following Tullamore RFC players have gone on to play for the Ireland national rugby team:
 Jordan Conroy (playing since 2016 for the national sevens team)
 Megan Burns (playing since 2018 for the women’s national sevens team)

References

Tullamore RFC

Irish rugby union teams
Rugby clubs established in 1937
Sport in Tullamore
Senior Irish rugby clubs (Leinster)
Rugby union clubs in County Offaly